The 1991 World Short Track Speed Skating Team Championships was the inaugural edition of the World Short Track Speed Skating Team Championships which took place on 30-31 March 1991 in Seoul, South Korea.

Medal winners

Results

Men

Women

References

External links
 Results
 Results book

World Short Track Speed Skating Team Championships
1991 World Short Track Speed Skating Team Championships